Grozny is a rural locality (a khutor) in Pobedenskoye Rural Settlement of Maykopsky District, Russia. The population was 695 as of 2018. There are 20 streets.

References 

Rural localities in Maykopsky District